Armaki (also Romanized as Armakī) is a village in Moqam Rural District, Shibkaveh District, Bandar Lengeh County, Hormozgan Province, Iran. At the 2006 census, its population was 68, in 11 families.

References 

Populated places in Bandar Lengeh County